Elexis "Lex" Gillette (born October 19, 1984) is a blind Paralympic athlete from Raleigh, North Carolina in the United States competing in T11 (track) and F11 (field) events for the United States.

He competed in the 2004 Summer Paralympics in Athens, where he won silver in the men's long jump F11 event. At the 2008 Summer Paralympics in Beijing, he won a silver medal in the men's long jump F11 event and finished fifth in the men's triple jump F11. He competed in 100 m and 200 m T11 events but did not advance to the finals. At the 2012 Summer Paralympics in London, he won a third consecutive silver medal in the men's long jump F11 event and finished fourth in the triple jump event. At the 2016 Summer Paralympics in Rio, he won a fourth consecutive silver medal in the men's Long Jump - T11 event. At the 2020 Summer Paralympics in Tokyo, he won a fifth consecutive silver medal in the men's Long Jump - T11 event.

In 2019, in Dubai, United Arab Emirates, Lex won the gold medal with a jump of 6.45 m during the 2019 World Para Athletics Championships – Men's long jump, marking his fourth world championship. At the 2013 IPC Athletics World Championships in Lyon, France, he won gold in the men's long jump F11 event and he also won silver in the triple jump event. Gillette was a part of the 2013 IPC Athletics World Championships 4 × 100 m relay team that won a silver medal and set a new American record in the process. Gillette broke his own long jump world record for F11 classified athletes of 6.73 m (22 feet 1 inch) with a leap of 6.77 m (22 feet 2 in.) on April 23, 2015, at a high performance meet held at the Chula Vista Olympic Training Center.

Education
He attended Athens Drive High School and graduated from East Carolina University in 2007.

Music
Lex Gillette is also a musician. He plays the piano and enjoys singing. Gillette released a music single on April 16, 2012, that was originally titled Go for Gold and was later changed to On the Stage.

Beep ball
While in high school, Gillette was introduced to beep ball, a modified form of baseball for the visually impaired and blind. In 2003, Gillette was recruited to play with the West Coast Dawgs of the National Beep Baseball Association. His first role with the team consisted mostly of designated hitter duties, but in 2005, Gillette became the starting right fielder for the Dawgs. In 2005 West Coast finished 5th in the World Series that were held in Houston, Texas. 2006 saw the Dawgs play in the championship game where they lost to the Taiwan Home Run. The 2007 World Series of Beep Ball were held in Rochester, Minnesota, and the Dawgs returned to the championship game only to lose to the Kansas All Stars. In 2008, Gillette won his first World Series title with the West Coast Dawgs as they outlasted Kansas for the world title. He was named to the offensive all-star team in the same year. The Dawgs returned to the 2009 World Series title game and repeated as champions against the Taiwan Home Run. In both 2010, and 2011, the West Coast Dawgs played in the World Series title game against the Taiwan Home Run, and both times, Gillette scored the game-winning run to put the Dawgs on top as world champions. ESPN’s E60 featured Gillette and the West Coast Dawgs’ 2011 title run.

Awards
In November 2015, Gillette received the Athletes in Excellence Award from The Foundation for Global Sports Development, in recognition of his community service efforts and work with youth.

Lex Gillette Day
Mayor David S. Gysberts and Washington County Board of Commissioners Terry Baker proclaimed September 25 Lex Gillette Day in both Hagerstown, Maryland and Washington County, MD.

Major Accomplishments
 2002: United States Association of Blind Athletes (USABA) Track and Field National Championships Gold Medalist - Long Jump, Colorado Springs, Colorado
 2004: Paralympic Games Silver Medalist - Long Jump, Athens, Greece
 2006: Paralympic World Cup Silver Medalist - Long Jump, Manchester, England
 2006: U.S. Paralympics Track and Field National Championships Gold Medalist - Long Jump, Atlanta, Georgia
 2006: IPC Athletics World Championships Silver Medalist - Long Jump, Assen, The Netherlands
 2007: U.S. Paralympics Track and Field National Championships Gold Medalist - Long Jump, Marietta, Georgia
 2007: Para-Pan American Games Bronze Medalist - Long Jump, Rio de Janeiro, Brazil
 2008: U.S. Paralympics track and Field National Championships Gold Medalist - Triple Jump, Tempe, Arizona
 2008: U.S. Paralympics track and Field National Championships Gold Medalist - Long Jump, Tempe, Arizona
 2008: Paralympic Games Silver Medalist - Long Jump, Beijing, China
 2010: Athletics Disability Challenge Gold Medalist - Long Jump, Liverpool, England
 2010: Paralympic World Cup Bronze Medalist - 100m sprint, Manchester, England
 2010: U.S. Paralympics Track and Field National Championships Gold Medalist - 200m sprint, Miramar, Florida
 2010: U.S. Paralympics Track and Field National Championships Gold Medalist - 100m sprint, Miramar, Florida
 2010: U.S. Paralympics Track and Field National Championships Gold Medalist - Triple Jump, Miramar, Florida
 2010: U.S. Paralympics Track and Field National Championships Gold Medalist - Long Jump, Miramar, Florida
 2011: IPC Athletics World Championships Bronze Medalist - 200m sprint, Christchurch, New Zealand
 2011: IPC Athletics World Championships Bronze Medalist - Triple Jump, Christchurch, New Zealand
 2011: Desert Challenge Games Gold Medalist - 100m sprint, Mesa, Arizona
 2011: Desert Challenge Games Gold Medalist - Long Jump, Mesa, Arizona
 2011: U.S. Paralympics Track and Field National Championships Gold Medalist - 200m sprint, Miramar, Florida
 2011: U.S. Paralympics Track and Field National Championships Gold Medalist - 100m sprint, Miramar, Florida
 2011: U.S. Paralympics Track and Field National Championships Gold Medalist - Triple Jump, Miramar, Florida
 2011: U.S. Paralympics Track and Field National Championships Gold Medalist - Long Jump, Miramar, Florida
 2012: Desert Challenge Games Gold Medalist - Long Jump, Mesa, Arizona
 2012: Paralympic Games Silver Medalist - Long Jump, London, England
 2013: U.S. Paralympics Track and Field National Championships Silver medalist - 100m Sprint, San Antonio, Texas
 2013: U.S. Paralympics Track and Field National Championships Gold Medalist - Triple Jump, San Antonio, Texas
 2013: U.S. Paralympics Track and Field National Championships Gold Medalist - Long Jump, San Antonio, Texas
 2013: IPC Athletics World Championships Silver Medalist - 4 × 100 m relay, Lyon, France
 2013: IPC Athletics World Championships Silver Medalist - Triple Jump, Lyon, France
 2013: IPC Athletics World Championships Gold Medalist - Long Jump, Lyon, France
 2014: Desert Challenge Games Gold Medalist - Long Jump, Mesa, Arizona
 2014: IX Internacional Meeting Kern Pharma, Gran Prix Sauleda Champion - Long Jump, Barcelona, Spain
 2014: Italian Open Championships Grand Prix Silver Medalist - 100m sprint, Grosseto, Italy
 2014: Italian Open Championships Grand Prix Gold Medalist - Long Jump, Grosseto, Italy
 2014: Meeting d’Athlétisme Paralympique de Paris Gold Medalist - Long Jump, Paris, France
 2014: U.S. Paralympics Track and Field National Championships Gold Medalist - Long Jump, San Mateo, California
 2014: IPC Athletics Grand Prix Finals Gold Medalist - Long Jump, Birmingham, England
 2015: Desert Challenge Games Gold Medalist - Long Jump, Tempe, Arizona
 2016: Paralympic Games Silver Medalist - Long Jump, Rio de Janeiro, Brazil
 2019: Silver Medalist, Long Jump, Parapan American Games, Lima, Peru
 2019: IPC Athletics World Championships Gold Medalist - Long Jump, Dubai, United Arab Emirates
 2021: Paralympic Games Silver Medalist - Long Jump, Tokyo, Japan

References

External links

1984 births
Living people
Visually impaired long jumpers
Paralympic track and field athletes of the United States
Track and field athletes from Raleigh, North Carolina
Athletes (track and field) at the 2008 Summer Paralympics
Paralympic silver medalists for the United States
World record holders in Paralympic athletics
American male long jumpers
American male triple jumpers
American male sprinters
East Carolina University alumni
Medalists at the 2004 Summer Paralympics
Medalists at the 2008 Summer Paralympics
Medalists at the 2012 Summer Paralympics
Medalists at the 2016 Summer Paralympics
Athletes (track and field) at the 2004 Summer Paralympics
Athletes (track and field) at the 2012 Summer Paralympics
Paralympic medalists in athletics (track and field)
Medalists at the World Para Athletics Championships
World Para Athletics Championships winners
Medalists at the 2007 Parapan American Games
Medalists at the 2015 Parapan American Games
Medalists at the 2019 Parapan American Games
Athletes (track and field) at the 2020 Summer Paralympics
University of Phoenix alumni
American blind people